"European Female" is a single by the British band The Stranglers, released in 1982. It is taken from the album Feline where it features under its full title "The European Female (In Celebration Of)". The track features bassist Jean-Jacques Burnel on lead vocals.

The single was the Stranglers' first for Epic Records. It reached number nine in the UK Singles Chart, where it spent six weeks.

References

1982 songs
1982 singles
Epic Records singles
The Stranglers songs
Songs written by Dave Greenfield
Songs written by Hugh Cornwell
Songs written by Jean-Jacques Burnel
Songs written by Jet Black